Hooley Hill Railway Station served the Hooley Hill area of Audenshaw and was located on the  to  Stalybridge Junction Railway. The Bradshaws timetable for 1922 listed 11 southbound & 12 northbound trains calling on Mondays to Saturdays, but none on Sundays.

The station was closed to passenger traffic by British Railways on 25 September 1950, shortly after nationalisation.

References
1940s OS map of the area
1912 Junction diagram of the Ashton Area

Disused railway stations in Tameside
Former London and North Western Railway stations
Railway stations in Great Britain opened in 1887
Railway stations in Great Britain closed in 1917
Railway stations in Great Britain opened in 1921
Railway stations in Great Britain closed in 1950
Audenshaw